Gigantometrus is a genus, whose members are also known by the collective vernacular name giant forest scorpions. There only two species in this genus.

Species
 Gigantometrus swammerdami 
 Gigantometrus titanicus

References

Scorpionidae
Animals described in 1978
Scorpions of Asia